Nakić is a Croatian surname. It may refer to:

Danira Bilić (née Danira Nakić), Croatian basketball player and politician
Franko Nakić (born 1972), Croatian-Greek basketball player
Mihovil Nakić (born 1955), Croatian basketball player and sports director

Croatian surnames